The Royal Medical Society (RMS) is a society run by students at the University of Edinburgh Medical School, Scotland. It claims to be the oldest medical society in the United Kingdom although this claim is also made by the earlier London-based Society of Apothecaries (1617). The current President of the 286th session is fourth year medical student Miss Prithi Natarajan. The RMS is a professional society engaged in the advancement of medical knowledge and provision of assistance to medical students and professionals.

History
In 1737 it was established as 'the Medical Society' in 1737. It was granted a Royal Charter in 1778. Earlier the Society was conceived in 1734 by a group of students who dissected the same body in the anatomy dissection room.  They included Dr Cleghorn, Dr Cuming, Dr Russell, Dr Hamilton, Mr Archibald Taylor and Dr James Kennedy and perhaps Dr Fothergill. The source is a letter to Dr Fothergill from Dr Cuming in 1782

The RMS sold its extensive library, built up throughout the 18th and 19th centuries, at 3 sales at Sotheby's in London in 1969. Much of the collection was purchased by the University of Wisconsin–Madison.

Journal
Res Medica is the journal of the Royal Medical Society. It was first published in 1957 which means that it one of the longest-running student-led publications in Britain.

The society today
The RMS owns rooms above Potterrow, the Edinburgh Students Union building, on Bristo Square. During the Edinburgh Festival Fringe, the rooms are used as a performance venue for Pleasance promoters and host the Performers'/VIP bar (Brooke's Bar). The estate, is managed by the RMS Trust, which has charitable status.

The day-to-day running of the Society is managed by the RMS Council – consisting of a Senior President, three Junior Presidents and 11 Conveners, each concerned with particular areas of the Society.

Notable members

 Thomas Harrison Burder
 William A.F. Browne, asylum reformer
 Robert Cleghorn, Hon President 1781, Senior President 1783
 Andrew Combe
 James Crichton-Browne, psychiatrist
 William Cullen, one of the founders of the society
 Charles Darwin
 Andrew Duncan, the elder, physician and six time President
 William Collins Engledue, phrenologist
 Benjamin Franklin
 Marshall Hall, elected Senior President in 1811
 Francis Home, First Professor of Material medica; elected 1740
 Matthew Kaufman
 Joseph Lister
 Drummond Shiels, a Fellow and Senior President
 Sir John Struthers, physician, anatomist
 Stuart Threipland, (see also  Fingask Castle), physician to Charles Edward Stuart (Bonnie Prince Charlie), President 1766–1770
 Jozef Venglos
 Hewett Watson, evolutionary theorist and friend of Charles Darwin, elected Senior President in 1831
 German Sims Woodhead, a former President

See also
 Royal College of Physicians of Edinburgh
 Royal College of Surgeons of Edinburgh
 Surgeon's Hall
 University of Edinburgh Medical School

References

Further reading

External links
 RMS website

1737 establishments in Scotland
History of the University of Edinburgh
Libraries in Scotland
Medical and health student organizations
Medical schools in Scotland
Organizations established in 1737
Organisations based in Edinburgh
Organisations based in Edinburgh with royal patronage
Professional associations based in Scotland
Scottish Enlightenment
Scottish medical associations
Students' unions in Scotland